The Virginia Attorney General election of 2013 took place on November 5, 2013, to elect the Attorney General of Virginia. The incumbent Attorney General, Republican Ken Cuccinelli, did not run for re-election. He was instead his party's nominee in the 2013 gubernatorial election.

On May 18, 2013, a Republican state convention in Richmond nominated State Senator Mark Obenshain over State Delegate Rob Bell. The Democratic primary on June 11, 2013, was won by State Senator Mark Herring, who defeated former Assistant United States Attorney Justin Fairfax.

While the statewide elections for governor and lieutenant governor garnered more national attention, the race for attorney general was the most competitive. Obenshain had an election night lead of 1,200 votes. In the following days, as provisional ballots were counted, Herring narrowed the lead and ultimately overtook him. On November 25, the Virginia State Board of Elections certified the results and Herring was declared the winner by 1,103,777 votes to 1,103,612 – a difference of 165 votes out of more than 2.2 million cast, or 0.007%.

After the certification, Obenshain requested a recount, which began on December 16. Obenshain conceded the election on December 18, and later that day, the recount ended with Herring winning by 907 votes, or 0.04%. Democrats held the Attorney General's office for the first time since 1994, and with Herring's victory, Democrats held all five statewide offices – including both U.S. Senate seats – for the first time since 1970.

Republican nomination

Candidates

Nominated at convention
 Mark Obenshain, state senator

Defeated at convention
 Rob Bell, state delegate

Withdrew
 John Frey, Fairfax County Clerk of the Circuit Court

Democratic primary

Candidates

Declared
 Justin Fairfax, former Assistant United States Attorney
 Mark Herring, state senator

Withdrew
 Michael Signer, attorney and candidate for lieutenant governor in 2009

Declined
 Ward Armstrong, former Minority Leader of the Virginia House of Delegates

Polling

Results

General election

Endorsements

Predictions

Polling

Initial results

Recount
It was widely reported that a recount was expected after the results were certified on November 25, 2013. According to the Virginia Board of Elections rules, as updated for the November 2013 election: "there are no automatic recounts. Only an apparent losing candidate can ask for a recount, and only if the difference between the apparent winning candidate and that apparent losing candidates is not more than one percent (1%) of the total votes cast for those two candidates." This race is the second of the past three Virginia attorney general elections to go to a recount. In the 2005 race, Bob McDonnell won by 360 votes, with the result certified in December.

Results

See also

2013 Virginia elections
2013 Virginia gubernatorial election
2013 Virginia lieutenant gubernatorial election
2013 United States gubernatorial elections

References

2013 Virginia elections
2013
Virginia